Xavier Davis (born 1971 in Grand Rapids, Michigan) is an American jazz pianist, composer, arranger, producer, and music educator who leads the Xavier Davis Trio. In addition to performing with the Christian McBride Big Band and other groups as a side man. In 2014 he was appointed Associate Professor of Jazz Piano at Michigan State University. He previously taught at the Juilliard Jazz program at the Juilliard School for six years. He performed on two Grammy-winning albums The Good Feeling, and Bringin' It with the Christian McBride Big Band. Davis was the Musical Director for the Boys Choir of Harlem for the 1999-2000 season. He appeared on the television series Cosby as a pianist.

Biography
While performing with his college ensemble at the 1994 International Association of Jazz Educators convention in Boston, vocalist Betty Carter caught his performance and took him to New York to work with her trio. Davis recognizes former Juilliard Jazz faculty chair and drummer Carl Allen, James Williams, and Billy Hart as mentors.

Discography

As leader

As sideman
Davis has recorded as a sideman for:

 Betty Carter
 Freddie Hubbard
 Tom Harrell
 Christian McBride
 Regina Carter
 Stefon Harris
 Abbey Lincoln
 Wynton Marsalis
 Don Byron
 Nat Adderley
 Nicholas Payton
 Jon Faddis
 Jimmy Greene
 Steve Turre, Keep Searchin' (HighNote, 2006) 
 Al Foster
 Jeremy Pelt
 Dion Parson
 Ron Blake

References

American jazz pianists
American male pianists
1971 births
Living people
Musicians from Grand Rapids, Michigan
Jazz musicians from Michigan
21st-century American pianists
21st-century American male musicians
American male jazz musicians
Christian McBride Big Band members
The New Jazz Composers Octet members